Túlio Humberto Pereira Costa (born 2 June 1969), sometimes simply referred as Túlio or Túlio Maravilha ("Wonder Túlio"), is a former Brazilian international footballer who played as a forward. He played for many Brazilian club teams, such as Goiás, Botafogo, Corinthians, Vitória, Fluminense, Cruzeiro and Vila Nova and several lower-division teams in Brazil. In Europe, he had short-lived career, playing for Sion and Újpest.

His best years were while he was at Botafogo, where he was three times the Brazilian top scorer (1989, 1994 and 1995) and won the 1995 Campeonato Brasileiro. After this he became a journeyman and never played for the same team for more than one season at most.

According to himself, he reached the mark of thousand goals in 2014, at 44 years old. This number was only reached, however, by counting goals in friendlies, commemorative games and amateur football.

International career
Tulio played 15 games with Brazil national team and scored 13 goals. The team never lost a match with Tulio on the pitch.

With the national team, Túlio was famous for scoring a controversial equalizer against Argentina in the quarter-finals of the 1995 Copa América in Uruguay in which he committed a deliberate handball. However, Túlio never played again for the Brazil national team.

Personal life
His son, Tulio Humberto Pereira da Costa Filho, was born on the same date as his father.

Honours

Club
Goiás
 Campeonato Goiano (Goiás State League): 1989, 1990 and 1991

Botafogo
 Campeonato Brasileiro Série A (Brazilian League): 1995
 Teresa Herrera Trophy: 1996
 Torneio Rio-São Paulo: 1998

Corinthians
 Campeonato Paulista (São Paulo State League): 1997

Cruzeiro
 Recopa Sudamericana: 1998

Vila Nova
 Campeonato Goiano (Goiás State League): 2001

São Caetano
 Campeonato Paulista Série A2 (São Paulo State 2nd Division League): 2000

Újpest
 Hungarian Cup: 2002

Brasiliense
 Campeonato Brasileiro Série C: 2002

Jorge Wilstermann
 Copa Aerosur: 2004

Volta Redonda
 Taça Guanabara: 2005
 Copa Finta Internacional: 2005

Itauçu
Campeonato Goiano da Terceira Divisão (Goiás State 3rd Division League): 2006

Individual
 Bola de Prata: 1989, 1990 and 1995
 Sharp Award: 1995
 Sony Award: 1995
 Campeonato Brasileiro Série A top scorer: 1989, 1994 and 1995
 Campeonato Brasileiro Série B top scorer: 2008
 Campeonato Brasileiro Série C top scorer: 2002 and 2007
 Campeonato Brasiliense (Federal District League) 2nd Division top scorer: 2009
 Campeonato Carioca top scorer (Rio de Janeiro State League): 1994, 1995 and 2005
 Campeonato Goiano top scorer (Goiás State League): 1991, 2001 and 2008
 Campeonato Goiano 3rd Division top scorer: 2006
 Campeonato Paulista Série A2 top scorer (São Paulo State 2nd Division): 2000

Records
 Goiás all-time leading scorer with 187 goals.
 Vila Nova all-time leading scorer with 99 goals.
 Holds the record for most goals scored in a single Série C, with 27 goals in 2007.
 Six time leading scorer of Campeonato Brasileiro, including Série A, B and C.
 He is the only player to be a leading scorer in three different levels in Brazilian football system (Série A, B and C).
 He was the Brazilian season scorer in 1995 (67 goals) and 2007 (50 goals).

See also 
 List of men's footballers with 500 or more goals

References 

Sportspeople from Goiânia
1969 births
Living people
Brazilian footballers
Brazilian expatriate footballers
Brazil international footballers
Association football forwards
Campeonato Brasileiro Série A players
Swiss Super League players
Expatriate footballers in Bolivia
Expatriate footballers in Hungary
Expatriate footballers in Switzerland
Expatriate footballers in the United Arab Emirates
Goiás Esporte Clube players
FC Sion players
Botafogo de Futebol e Regatas players
Sport Club Corinthians Paulista players
Esporte Clube Vitória players
Fluminense FC players
Vila Nova Futebol Clube players
Associação Desportiva São Caetano players
Santa Cruz Futebol Clube players
Újpest FC players
Brasiliense Futebol Clube players
Atlético Clube Goianiense players
C.D. Jorge Wilstermann players
Associação Atlética Anapolina players
Volta Redonda FC players
Esporte Clube Juventude players
Al Shabab Al Arabi Club Dubai players
Nacional Fast Clube players
Itumbiara Esporte Clube players
Goiânia Esporte Clube players
Associação Botafogo Futebol Clube players
Bonsucesso Futebol Clube players
Tanabi Esporte Clube players
UAE Pro League players
Nemzeti Bajnokság I players
1995 Copa América players